Madeline Hollander is an American artist, choreographer, and dancer, living and working in New York City. Her work explores the evolution of human body movement and the intersection between choreography and visual art.

Early life and education
Madeline Hollander was born in 1986 in Los Angeles, California. She trained with Yvonne Mounsey while growing up in Los Angeles and she danced professionally with the Los Angeles Ballet and with Angel Corella’s Barcelona Ballet.
She received a Bachelor's Associates degree from Barnard College of Columbia University in 2008 and attended the MFA program at Bard College's Milton Avery Graduate School of the Arts from 2016 to 2019.

Artistic practice
Madeline Hollander is an avid observer of everyday gestures. Her work investigates the body's ability to communicate and respond within the limits of everyday systems. Since 2013, Hollander has been adding to Gesture Archive, a longitudinal research project surveying expressive human movement in all its variety. She uses performance and dance to communicate how the space in contemporary art can be experienced rather than the space being simply a reaction to the art object. These dances and performances build on the ballets Hollander danced growing up. The movements often reflect her observations of gesture and emulate the everyday. Benjamin Millepied, the artistic director of L.A. Dance Project and a former New York City Ballet principal, said “there’s a clear understanding of classical craft when it comes to the architecture of her dances." Hollander’s fascination with systems goes beyond repeating existing systems. She constructs systems of her own that involve placing the body in conversation with various contexts, such as molecular or mechanical arrangements. 

As well as creating choreography, Hollander has developed an intuitive and organic system of color codes and pictographs to recall her movements. “The drawings are only meant to be understood by me and the dancers. It’s a system for recall. To remind the bodies who already lived through the movements.” As well as creating an extensive body of her own work, Hollander collaborates as a choreographer with other artists. She made her debut in Hollywood, as a movement consultant and choreographer for Jordan Peele’s “Us.” In addition, she has helped develop physical vocabularies for the characters’ ‘duelling’ selves. Hollander participated in Helsinki Contemporary's, "Future Delay", a show curated by New York-based Amanda Schmitt, where she, Pearla Pigao, and Hans Rosenström were commissioned to explore the future potential of technological immortality. Hollander consistently seeks inspiration by drawing her choreography's vocabulary from varied sources such as the interaction of interface design (Illegal Motion, 2015); sports referee gestures (Mile, 2016); and building evacuation procedures (Drill, 2016).

Heads/Tails
Hollander's work "Heads/Tails" is her first major exhibition without human actors. The installation consists of hundreds of used automobile headlights and taillights, covering opposite walls of the gallery, synched with the traffic signal at the nearby intersection of Walker Street and Broadway. 

Cars driving along Walker Street trigger the installation’s taillights when they break, resulting in their illumination. These effects are modeled after the behaviors of various New York City drivers. The lights of the installation turn off when the street light changes to green. At sunset the headlights in the installation change to a "brights" setting and at sunrise they revert to a “fog light” setting in a perpetual cycle.

Alongside the installation of car lights, Hollander exhibits a series of watercolors that mirror the pictographs she uses to help her and her dancers recall their movements. These watercolors, while seemingly abstract, have the capacity to signify the featured movement sequences, detailed drawings of hand gestures, and multicolored circles that function as graphemes. These works remind viewers of the correlation between the city and the body constantly circulating with a heartbeat. A text by A.E. Benenson addressing the history of New York City traffic and its regulation of movement vis-a-vis concepts of progress, performance and order accompanies the exhibition. It is presented alongside a small bronze statue of Mercury, one of the 104 that adorned the tops of traffic lights along Fifth Avenue from 1931-1964, and have since largely gone missing.

New Max
As with all Hollander’s work to date, the dancers’ choreography references or “cites” everyday physical activities. The project notes for "New Max" describe the installation as, "Performance begins at 65 degrees Fahrenheit, and dancers continuously hit a new maximum temperature each round." 

The starting temperature in the room is 65 degrees Fahrenheit as this is the museum standard for storing works of art. The choreography is a series of scripted movements that create body heat, raising the room’s temperature to 85 degrees. This change in room temperature takes place over a series of sixteen rounds. Each round with a new min and max temp and the goal of Round 1 is to get to 70 degrees, triggering the air conditioning units to turn on and cool the room. This begins round two at a starting temperature of 66 degrees. As this pattern continues, two Dancers track their progress by the room’s lights that are attached to a temperature sensor and become brighter as the room heats up. When the temperature reaches the maximum, the lights turn off, the air conditioning units turn on, and the dancers rest. Once the minimum temperature is reached again, the dancers are back in motion.

Performances and choreography

Gesture Archive: BASE (2013) - Human Resources - Los Angeles, CA
2014 - Futurevisions, Torrance Shipman Gallery, New York
DRAFT (2014) - Jack Hanley Gallery - New York City
Heimlich at SkowheganPERFORMS (2016) - Socrates Sculpture Park, New York
In Practice: Under Foundations (2015) - SculptureCenter - New York City
Arena (2017) - Rockaway Beach  - New York City
New Max (2018) - Artist’s Institute - New York City
Urs Fischer’s PLAY (2018) - Gagosian - New York City
Work Marathon festival (2018) - Serpentine Galleries - London
Us (2019 film) - choreographer
Whitney Biennial (2019) - curated by Rujeko Hockley and Jane Panetta

Grants, residencies and awards

2015 - Fountainhead Studios Artist Residency, Miami, FL
2015 - Choreographic Coding Lab: Motion-Bank, Center for the Art of Performance, UCLA
2015 - Skowhegan School of Painting and Sculpture
2016 - Socrates Sculpture Park Emerging Artist Fellowship

References

1986 births
Living people
21st-century American artists
Barnard College alumni
American contemporary artists